Albert Ernest James Millard (14 June 1906 – 5 January 1983) was an Australian rules footballer who played with  in the Victorian Football League (VFL).

Early life
The son of Vivian Harry Millard (1883–1962) and Evelyn Millard, nee Reynolds (1881–1948), Alby Millard was born in Hawthorn on 14 June 1906.

Football
Millard joined Hawthorn at the start of the 1926 VFL season having commenced his career with Camberwell in the Melbourne Districts League. He had the misfortune to injure a knee ligament in the final pre-season practice match but returned via the reserves and played on the wing in the final game of the season against Melbourne. Although frequently named in the better players in the reserves in 1927, he never played another senior game.

Later life
Alby Millard worked as a clicker both during and after his football career. He married Lily Isabel Revitt in 1942 and they lived in the outer eastern suburbs of Melbourne until his death in January 1983. He was cremated at Springvale Botanical Cemetery.

References

External links 

1906 births
1983 deaths
Australian rules footballers from Melbourne
Camberwell Football Club players
Hawthorn Football Club players
People from Hawthorn, Victoria